Aritz Arambarri Murua (born 31 January 1998) is a Spanish professional footballer who plays as a central defender for Real Sociedad B.

Club career
Born in Azkoitia, Gipuzkoa, Basque Country, Arambarri represented Real Sociedad as youth, joining the club's youth setup in 2011. He made his senior debut with the C-team during the 2016–17 season, in Tercera División.

Arambarri was definitely promoted to the reserves in Segunda División B midway through the 2018–19 campaign, and scored his first senior goal with the side on 9 December 2018 in a 4–2 home win against CD Vitoria. On 1 July 2020, he renewed his contract until 2023.

Arambarri made his first team – and La Liga – debut on 1 November 2020, coming on as a second-half substitute for fellow youth graduate Andoni Gorosabel in a 4–1 home routing of Celta de Vigo.

References

External links
 
 

1998 births
Living people
Sportspeople from Gipuzkoa
People from Azkoitia
Spanish footballers
Footballers from the Basque Country (autonomous community)
Association football defenders
La Liga players
Segunda División B players
Tercera División players
Real Sociedad C footballers
Real Sociedad B footballers
Real Sociedad footballers